Mintz is a surname. Its etymology may be connected to the German city of Mainz. Notable people with the surname include:
 Beatrice Mintz (1921–2022), American embryologist
 Binyamin Mintz (1903–1961), Israeli politician
 Charles Mintz (1896-1940), American film producer and distributor
 Christopher Mintz-Plasse (born 1989), American actor, comedian and musician
 Dan Mintz, American actor and comedian (born 1981)
 Dan Mintz (producer, director and executive), A US entertainment CEO (born 1965)
 David Hammerstein Mintz (born 1955), Spanish politician
 Elliot Mintz
 Grafton_K._Mintz (1925–1983), an American writer/translator who lived in South Korea
 Humphrey Mintz, fictional character in the Suikoden role playing games
 Jordan Mintz, former Vice President and General Counsel for Corporate Development at Enron Corporation
 Joshua Mintz, British/Israeli journalist and activist
 Morton Mintz, American investigative journalist
 Noah Mintz, Canadian musician
 Sam Mintz (1897-1957), American screenwriter
 Shlomo Mintz (born 1957), Israeli violin virtuoso, violist and conductor
 Sidney Mintz (1922-2015), American anthropologist
 Tanhum Cohen-Mintz (1939-2014), Latvian-born Israeli basketball player
 Uri Cohen-Mintz (born 1973), Israeli basketball player

Mints 
 Lloyd Mints (1888–1989), American economist
 Zara Mints, a Jewish Russian philologist

Minc 
 Hilary Minc

See also 
 David Mintz (disambiguation)
 Mintz, Levin, Cohn, Ferris, Glovsky, and Popeo, fourth largest law firm in Massachusetts by number of attorneys
 Minz
 Mentz (disambiguation)
 Munz
 Muntz

Jewish surnames
Germanic-language surnames